

Seeds

  Květa Peschke  /  Lisa Raymond (semifinals, retired)
  Yan Zi /  Zheng Jie  (final)
  Raquel Kops-Jones  /  Bethanie Mattek-Sands (champions)
  Alona Bondarenko  /  Kateryna Bondarenko (semifinals)

Draw

Brackets

External links
Draw

Warsaw Open
Warsaw Open